Natalia Belén Salvador Marambio (born 28 September 1993) is a field hockey goalkeeper from Chile.

Career

Club hockey
Natalia Salvador is a former player of Chilean club, Universidad Católica.

In 2020, she moved to Spain to play for Junior FC in the Liga Iberdrola.

National team
Natalia Salvador made her debut for the Chilean national team in 2012.

Since her debut, Salvador has been a constant inclusion in the national team. In 2019 she won a bronze medal with the team at the FIH Series Finals in Hiroshima. She also won silver at the 2022 Pan American Cup in Santiago.

In 2022, she was named in the national squad for the FIH World Cup in Terrassa and Amsterdam.

References

External links

1993 births
Living people
Chilean female field hockey players
Female field hockey goalkeepers
Competitors at the 2022 South American Games
South American Games gold medalists for Chile
South American Games medalists in field hockey
20th-century Chilean women
21st-century Chilean women